Charlton is a town in Worcester County, Massachusetts, United States.  The population was 13,315 at the 2020 census.

History 
Charlton was first settled in 1735. It was established as a District separated from Oxford on January 10, 1755, and became a Town on August 23, 1775 by a law that made all Districts into Towns to help for the cause of the Revolutionary War.  It was named after Sir Francis Charlton. During the 1800s, farming continued to be the major occupation, but woolen mills were being built along some of the town's brooks by the turn of the twentieth century.

Geography

The town is bordered on the west by Sturbridge; on the north by East Brookfield, Spencer and Leicester; on the east by Oxford; and on the south by Dudley and Southbridge.

Charlton is bisected by north–south Route 31, which runs through the historical villages of Charlton Center, Charlton City and Charlton Depot. North-south Route 169 connects Charlton City with Southbridge. East–west routes include Route 20, a major commuter road, and the Massachusetts Turnpike (Interstate 90), which crosses through Charlton but does not have an exit in the town. While there is no exit for the town, there are two rest stops on the Mass Pike that are in Charlton.

Demographics

As of the census of 2000, there were 11,263 people, 3,788 households, and 3,045 families residing in the town. The racial makeup of the town was 98.08% White, 0.46% African American, 0.23% Native American, 0.20% Asian, 0.06% Pacific Islander, 0.34% from other races, and 0.62% from two or more races. Hispanic or Latino of any race were 0.98% of the population.

There were 3,788 households, out of which 45.3% had children under the age of 18 living with them, 67.4% were married couples living together, 9.8% had a female householder with no husband present, and 19.6% were non-families. 14.5% of all households were made up of individuals, and 4.4% had someone living alone who was 65 years of age or older.  The average household size was 2.92 and the average family size was 3.24.

In the town, the population was spread out, with 30.0% under the age of 18, 5.8% from 18 to 24, 34.4% from 25 to 44, 22.1% from 45 to 64, and 7.7% who were 65 years of age or older.  The median age was 35 years. For every 100 females, there were 95.9 males.  For every 100 females age 18 and over, there were 93.8 males.

The median income for a household in the town was $63,033, and the median income for a family was $70,208. Males had a median income of $46,727 versus $33,451 for females. The per capita income for the town was $23,626.  About 4.9% of families and 5.6% of the population were below the poverty line, including 4.3% of those under age 18 and 10.7% of those age 65 or over.

Government
Charlton has an open town meeting form of government, with a five-member Board of Selectmen.

Library

The Charlton Free Public Library was established in 1882. In fiscal year 2008, the town of Charlton spent 1.73% ($306,971) of its budget on its public library—some $24 per person. The library gained national recognition in 1906 after it banned Mark Twain's short story "Eve's Diary" for its illustrations of Eve in "summer costume." Twain testified before Congress after the incident saying, "The whole episode has rather amused me. I have no feeling of vindictiveness over the stand of the librarians there—I am only amused. You see they did not object to my book; they objected to Lester Ralph's pictures. I wrote the book; I did not make the pictures. I admire the pictures, and I heartily approve them, but I did not make them. It seems curious to me—some of the incidents in this case. It appears that the pictures in Eve's Diary were first discovered by a lady librarian. When she made the dreadful find, being very careful, she jumped at no hasty conclusions—not she—she examined the horrid things in detail. It took her some time to examine them all, but she did her hateful duty! I don't blame her for this careful examination; the time she spent was, I am sure, enjoyable, for I found considerable fascination in them myself. Then she took the book to another librarian, a male this time, and he, also, took a long time to examine the unclothed ladies. He must have found something of the same sort of fascination in them that I found."

Education
Charlton public schools are part of the Dudley–Charlton Regional School district.  Charlton Elementary serves students in kindergarten and first grade. The Heritage School serves students in grades 2 through 4. The Charlton Middle School serves grades 5 through 8. Charlton High Schoolers (ninth grade through twelfth grade) attend Shepherd Hill Regional High School in Dudley.

Charlton is also home to Bay Path Regional Vocational Technical High School which serves Charlton and surrounding communities.

There used to be a high school in the center of town called Charlton High School. That building is now used for the Charlton Municipal Offices.

Points / People of interest
 Grave of John "Grizzly" Adams in Bay Path Cemetery.
 John Spurr House.
 Rider Tavern.
 Charlton Center Historic District.
 Northside Village Historic District.
 No. 2 Schoolhouse.
 Headquarters of Nature's Classroom.
 Heritage Country Club.
 Buffumville Lake.
 Elliott P. Joslin Camps for Children with Diabetes.
 Bay Path Regional Vocational Technical High School.
 Tree House Brewing Company
 The residence of the person who first demonstrated ether as a surgical anesthetic, William T. G. Morton.
On July 26, 2012 the back of the Charlton Woolen Mill, an historic landmark, burnt to the ground. It was a "5-Alarm Fire", and firefighting efforts contained the destruction to only that one section of one of the mills.)

References

External links

Charlton official website
Dudley-Charlton Regional School District official website
Charlton Historical Society
Charlton Public Library

 
Towns in Worcester County, Massachusetts
Towns in Massachusetts